Francesco Navazzotti (born September 28, 1954 in Cesano Boscone) is a retired Italian professional football player. He recently worked as a goalkeepers' coach for one of the youth teams of A.C. Milan, and in 2017, has been working with Juventus youth academy.

He played 1 game in the Serie A for A.C. Milan in the 1979/80 season.

See also
Football in Italy
List of football clubs in Italy

References

1954 births
Living people
Italian footballers
Serie A players
Calcio Lecco 1912 players
A.C. Milan players
Reggina 1914 players
A.C. Monza players
Association football goalkeepers